Malakula Island, also spelled Malekula, is the second-largest island in the nation of Vanuatu, formerly the New Hebrides, in Melanesia, a region of the Pacific Ocean.

Location
Malakula is separated from the islands of Espiritu Santo and Malo by the Bougainville Strait. Lakatoro, the capital of Malampa Province, is situated on Malakula’s northeastern shore and is the largest settlement on the island. Just off the northeastern coast of Malakula,  there is a group of islands called the Small Islands, including, in order from north to south: Vao, Atchin, Wala, Rano, Norsup, Uripiv, and Uri. Also off the coast: Tomman Island to the southwest; Akhamb Island to the south; and the Maskelynes Islands to the southeast (including Sakao Island and Uluveo).

Malakula has a maximum elevation of 879 m. Its peak is called Mt. Liambele. In 1768, Louis Antoine de Bougainville gave his name to the straits that  separate Malakula from Santo.

History 

Malakula was inhabited for centuries by the Ni-Vanuatu people before Europeans encountered it. The first Europeans to sight the island were the members of the Spanish expedition of Pedro Fernández de Quirós, in 1606.

After being visited in 1774 by Captain James Cook, on his second voyage to the Pacific, the islands were colonised in the late 18th century by both the British and the French, eventually becoming a condominion
called in English the New Hebrides.

In 1914 and 1915 the British anthropologist John Layard lived on Malakula, doing anthropological fieldwork, taking notes, making phonographic records, and taking more than 400 photographs. When he returned to Britain, he donated copies of his photographs on plates to the Museum of Archaeology and Anthropology, at Cambridge.

Demographics
According to the 2009 census, Malakula has around 23,000 inhabitants.
 
Nearly thirty different languages are spoken on the island. The two tribes living there are the Big Nambas, who live in the northern area of the island, and the Small Nambas, who live in the central part of the southern area. The tribes’ names are a reference to the size of the penis sheaths worn by the men, which are made out of banana or pandanus leaves.

Until recently, it was the custom in the culture of these tribes to bind infants' skulls in order to permanently alter the shape of their heads. Cone-shaped skulls were considered a sign of higher social status.

Economy and services

Malakula's economy is largely based on agriculture. The island has extensive copra plantations on the eastern coastal plains around Norsup and Lakatoro. The largest copra-producing plantation in Vanuatu is in Norsup.
In 1939, a copra cooperative was set up at Matanvat in northern Malakula. For a while it turned to cargo cult activities, but after 1950 it resumed copra production.

Both Norsup and Lakatoro have telephones and 24-hour electricity. Norsup is the site of the provincial hospital. Lakatoro has more stores than Norsup. It has a market house, a branch of the National Bank of Vanuatu, and an Air Vanuatu office. It is also the site of the island’s main wharf and the administrative centre for Malampa province (which includes Malekula, Ambrym and Paama).

Tourism
The interior of Malekula is mountainous, rugged, and forest-covered. It is a good place for walking and bird watching. There are old cannibal sites hidden in the bush in northern Malekula, but at many of them the bones and skulls have been removed or buried. The Maskelynes and the small offshore islands along the east coast of Malekula have sand beaches, as well as coral reefs that are good places for recreational snorkeling and diving.

Transportation

Air transport
There are three airports on Malekula. They are located at Norsup (in the northern part of the island), Lamap (in the southeastern part of the island), and Southwest Bay. The Norsup airport has a tarmac surface. Air Vanuatu operates daily flights to Malekula.

Road transport
Lakatoro is Malekula's road-transport hub. The best place to find trucks is at the Lakatoro Trading Centre. There are several trucks along the northeast coast as far as Vao.

See also 
Maskelynes Islands
Malekula languages

Literature 
 Haidy Geismar and Anita Herle: Moving images. John Layard, fieldwork and photography on Malakula since 1914, Crawford House Publishing Australia, Adelaide, South Australia, 2009 
 in Bislama language John Layard long Malakula 1914–1915, Vanuatu Cultural Centre

References

External links

 Malakula Flag
 Malekula Island Hiking & Tourism
 Malekula Images
 Malekula Interactive Map
 Ann Skinner-Jones and Joan Larcom Photographs The collection focuses on the people's experiences of independence and new nationhood (1973-1985), mostly on the island of Malakula. UC San Diego Library.

Islands of Vanuatu
Malampa Province